Vindhya Tiwari (born 22 November 1992) is an Indian television actress and  Indian soap operas. Her breakthrough role was in the drama Agle Janam Mohe Bitiya Hi Kijo on Zee TV n she is best known for her role in Maryada: Lekin Kab Tak? on Star Plus as Vidya for which she got nominated for best television actress in Indian television academy awards (ita). She played the Role of Main Female Antagonist Chandramani in Sasural Simar Ka on Colors TV  She also played the lead in Badi Door Se Aaye Hain as Sonachandi on SAB TV.

Early life
Tiwari was born in Ramnagar, in Varanasi district, Uttar Pradesh. She aspired to become an actress at a very young age.

Television

Filmography

References

External links
https://www.filmibeat.com/bollywood/movies/the-conversion-bollywood-movie.html
 
 

1989 births
Living people
Actresses from Varanasi
21st-century Indian actresses
Actresses in Hindi television
Indian television actresses
Indian soap opera actresses